Shamma Al Bastaki,  (born 1997) is an Emirati artist and poet. She is also an ambassador for Louvre Abu Dhabi, as well as the recipient of awards for her writing and art. She co-founded several literary networks, including the collective, Untold Stories and formed the Cultural Office Women's Creative Network.

Biography 
Al Bastaki was born in Dubai in 1997. She studied Sociology and Public Policy with Literature and Creative Writing at NYU Abu Dhabi, a college within New York University. In 2015 she began her role as a cultural ambassador for Louvre Abu Dhabi.

A poet since she was seven-years-old, she published her first volume of poetry House to House بيت لبيت’ in 2019, which was popularised by the journal Asymptote. The volume was based on oral histories from the Dubai Creek region, which were then presented creatively as poetry. She was one of the first members of the Cultural Office Women's Creative Network, which was launched by HH Sheikha Manal Bint Monammed Bin Rashed Al Maktoum. She is also a founding member of Untitled Chapters – a literary group for Emirati women writers. She is the co-founder of the JARA Collective, which runs a small publishing house with a focus on Chapbooks. She has spoken at the Emirates Literature Festival, as well as the Hay Festival. At the Emirates Festival in 2021 she spoke as part of a panel entitled "Beyond Poetry".

In addition to her work as a poet, she is also a visual artist. Her work includes calligraphy, for which she was the recipient of an Abu Dhabi Festival Visual Arts Award. She also makes dolls, which are transformed with the use of various substances to create works that comment on childhood and trauma.

Awards 

 Salama Bint Hamdan Emerging Artists Fellowship
 ADMAF Creativity Award (2019)
 NYU President's Service Award
 Abu Dhabi Festival Visual Arts Award – 2nd place (2016)

References

External links 

 Performance: The Power of Words Teaser – Talking With Poet, Shamma Al Bastaki
 Poem: “DOME” by Shamma Al Bastaki
 Poem: House to House

Living people
1997 births
21st-century Emirati poets
Emirati artists
Emirati women artists
Emirati women poets
New York University Abu Dhabi alumni